Lakhimpur Assembly constituency is one of the 126 assembly constituencies of Assam a north east state of India. Lakhimpur is also part of Lakhimpur Lok Sabha constituency.

Members of Legislative Assembly
 1972: Shubhankar Singha, Indian National Congress
 1978: Sulo Bora, Communist Party of India
 1983: Lekhan Lahan, Indian National Congress
 1985: Utpal Dutta, Independent
 1991: Indra Gogoi, Indian National Congress
 1996: Utpal Dutta, Asom Gana Parishad
 2001: Utpal Dutta, Asom Gana Parishad
 2006: Ghana Buragohain, Indian National Congress
 2011: Utpal Dutta, Asom Gana Parishad
 2016: Utpal Dutta, Asom Gana Parishad
2021: Manab Deka, Bharatiya Janata Party

References

External links 
 

Assembly constituencies of Assam
Lakhimpur district